Mount Dan Beard is a  mountain in the Alaska Range, in Denali National Park and Preserve. Mount Dan Beard lies to the southeast of Denali, overlooking the Don Sheldon Amphitheater of Ruth Glacier. The mountain was named in 1910 by Herschel Clifford Parker and Belmore Browne for illustrator Daniel Carter Beard, who founded the scouting organization Sons of Daniel Boone.

See also
Mountain peaks of Alaska

References

Alaska Range
Mountains of Matanuska-Susitna Borough, Alaska
Mountains of Denali National Park and Preserve
Mountains of Alaska